IAD or Iad may stand for:

Organisations and businesses 
AirAsia India, ICAO airline code IAD
Internal affairs (law enforcement), or Internal Affairs Division (IAD), the police agency division that investigates possible misconduct
Inter-American Dialogue, or  IAD, a non-profit organization in Washington DC
International Automotive Design, or IAD, a British car manufacturer
Iraqi Army Division, or IAD

Places, airport codes
Iad (river), a tributary of the Crișul Repede in Bihor County, Romania
Iad, a tributary of the Bistrița (Someș) in Bistrița-Năsăud County, Romania
 Livezile, Bistrița-Năsăud, Romania, Livezile Commune was formerly called Iad
Washington Dulles International Airport, IATA airport code IAD

Technology
iAd, a mobile advertising service operated by Apple Inc.
Integrated access device, or IAD
Intelligent Assist Device (robotics), or IAD
Internet addiction disorder, or IAD

Other uses
Institutional analysis and development framework, or IAD, a systematic method in policy analysis
Instructor-assisted deployment, or IAD, a parachute deployment method for student skydivers
Interaction design, or IAD
International Air Distress, or IAD, a radio frequency
Intramolecular aglycon delivery, or IAD, a stereospecific glycosylation technique in organic carbohydrate chemistry